Pakistan Super League is a professional Twenty20 cricket league, which is operated by Pakistan Cricket Board. It is contested between six franchises comprising cricketers from Pakistan and around the world.

In cricket, a dismissal occurs when the batsman is out (also known as the fielding side taking a wicket and/or the batting side losing a wicket). At this point a batsman must discontinue batting and leave the field permanently for the innings.

Key

Five-wicket hauls
In cricket, a five-wicket haul (also known as a "five-for" or "fifer") refers to a bowler taking five or more wickets in a single innings. This is regarded as a notable achievement.

Hat-tricks
In cricket, a hat-trick occurs in when a bowler dismisses three batsmen with consecutive deliveries.

Season overview

Team overview

See also
List of Pakistan Super League cricketers
List of Pakistan Super League records and statistics

Notes
Above information is valid as of 3 February 2022 – via ESPNcricinfo.

References

Bowling records